Dennis Alan Johnson (born December 4, 1979) is a former American football defensive end who played for the Arizona Cardinals and San Francisco 49ers of the National Football League (NFL). While playing his senior season for Harrodsburg High School, he was named the National Player of the Year by Sports Illustrated and 1997 National High School Defensive Player of the Year by USA Today and The Sporting News. Johnson attended the University of Kentucky, where he was a Third-team All-American and All-Southeastern Conference (SEC) First-team defender.

Johnson is currently the head football coach and district athletic director at Woodford County High School in Versailles, Kentucky.

Early life
Dennis Johnson grew up in Kentucky, where the local high school had very low enrollment. Due to Harrodsburg High School's small size, Johnson was allowed to suit up with the high school varsity team as a second grader. He already stood 5'7" and weighed 170 pounds. His brother, a third grader, was also on the team. The brothers rarely got into a game, but they created enough attention that the state changed the eligibility rules for low-enrollment schools. The brothers had to wait until the seventh grade to play varsity football again. When he returned to the team at age 11, he earned honorable mention all-state honors as a defensive end. Johnson ended his high school career with seven seasons of play and six varsity letters. He was selected as the Sports Illustrated National Player of the Year and the National Defensive Player of the Year by USA Today and The Sporting News.

College career
Johnson attended the University of Kentucky after also being recruited by the University of Notre Dame, the University of Florida, the University of Miami and the University of Colorado. His father Alvis Johnson, who had been a football coach and athletic director at Harrodsburg High School between 1975 and 1997, joined Kentucky as associate athletic director a few months after Johnson committed to the team. Johnson was redshirted after the first game of his junior season (2000) due to an ankle injury. Upon his return in 2001, he led the SEC in tackles for loss, sacks and forced fumbles. He left Kentucky to enter the NFL draft with a year of collegiate eligibility remaining.

NFL career
Johnson was drafted in the third round of the 2002 NFL Draft. Johnson played full seasons for the Arizona Cardinals in 2003 and 2004. He appeared in one game for the San Francisco 49ers in 2005. Johnson finished his career with 57 tackles and 3 sacks in 29 games.

References

External links
 NFL.com Profile
 NFL Draft Profile

1979 births
Living people
People from Danville, Kentucky
People from Mercer County, Kentucky
American football defensive ends
Kentucky Wildcats football players
Players of American football from Kentucky
Arizona Cardinals players
San Francisco 49ers players
Kentucky Horsemen players